Clara Chu is a Chinese-Canadian library and information science scholar. She is the Director of the Mortenson Center for International Library Programs at the University of Illinois at Urbana-Champaign. Her research interest is in multicultural library and information services.

Early life and education 
Chu was born in Chiclayo, Peru, to Cantonese parents. Her family immigrated to Vancouver, Canada, when she was 10 years old. Chu completed her undergraduate education from the University of British Columbia, majoring in Spanish literature.  She graduated from the University of Western Ontario with master's and doctoral degrees in library and information science.

Career 
Chu previously held positions at the University of North Carolina-Greensboro and University of California at Los Angeles.  She is a former president of the Association for Library and Information Science Education (ALISE).

She was appointed the Director of the Mortenson Center for International Library Programs, and Mortenson Distinguished Professor at the University of Illinois at Urbana-Champaign in 2015.

Chu is one of the leading scholars on multiculturalism and information practices. She co-wrote a work exploring the value of internship as a form of experiential learning in library and information science education.

Awards and honors
She was honored by the American Library Association with the Equality Award in 2002, and again in 2018 with the Beta Phi Mu Award.

References 

Living people
Canadian librarians
University of Illinois Urbana-Champaign faculty
University of Western Ontario alumni
American Library Association people
University of British Columbia alumni
University of North Carolina at Greensboro faculty
UCLA Graduate School of Education and Information Studies faculty
American librarians
American women librarians
Canadian people of Chinese descent
Place of birth missing (living people)
Year of birth missing (living people)
American women academics
American librarians of Chinese descent
21st-century American women
Canadian women librarians